Notiodes is a genus of marsh weevils in the beetle family Erirhinidae. There are about 16 described species in Notiodes.

Erirhinidae is sometimes considered a family, and sometimes treated as a subfamily, in which case Notoides is considered a member of the family Brachyceridae.

Species
These 16 species belong to the genus Notiodes:

 Notiodes aeratus (LeConte, 1876)
 Notiodes apiculatus Schoenherr, 1843
 Notiodes celatus (Burke, 1961)
 Notiodes cribricollis (LeConte, 1876)
 Notiodes depressus (Burke, 1961)
 Notiodes disgregus (Burke, 1961)
 Notiodes egenus Schoenherr, 1843
 Notiodes laticollis (Blatchley, 1916)
 Notiodes limatulus (Gyllenhal, 1836)
 Notiodes nigrirostris Boheman, 1843
 Notiodes ovalis (LeConte, 1876)
 Notiodes pumilis (Burke, 1965)
 Notiodes punctatus (LeConte, 1876)
 Notiodes robustus (Schaeffer, 1908)
 Notiodes setosus (LeConte, 1876)
 Notiodes sporcarpius O'Brien, 2009

References

Further reading

 

Weevils